Frank Buckland may refer to:

 Frank Buckland (ice hockey) (1902–1991), Canadian ice hockey player
 Francis Trevelyan Buckland (1826–1880), English surgeon and naturalist
 Frank Buckland (politician) (1847–1915), New Zealand member of parliament and cricketer
 Francis Buckland (cricketer), English cricketer